Birger Eklund (22 October 1929 – 6 December 2015) was a Swedish footballer. He made 128 Allsvenskan appearances for Djurgårdens IF and scored 38 goals.

Honours

Club 

 Djurgårdens IF 
 Allsvenskan (2): 1954–55, 1959

References

Swedish footballers
Sweden international footballers
Allsvenskan players
Djurgårdens IF Fotboll players
1929 births
2015 deaths
Association football forwards